Nymphomaniac (stylised as NYMPH()MANIAC onscreen and in advertising) is a 2013 erotic art film written and directed by Lars von Trier. The film stars Charlotte Gainsbourg, Stellan Skarsgård, Stacy Martin, Shia LaBeouf, Christian Slater, Jamie Bell, Uma Thurman, Jean-Marc Barr, Willem Dafoe, Connie Nielsen and Mia Goth in her debut. Separated as two-part films, the plot follows Joe (played by Gainsbourg and Martin), a self-diagnosed "nymphomaniac," who recounts her erotic experiences to a bachelor who helps her recover from an assault. The narrative chronicles Joe's promiscuous life from adolescence to adulthood and is split into eight chapters told across two volumes. The film was originally supposed to be only one complete entry, but, because of its length, von Trier made the decision to split the project into two separate films. Nymphomaniac was an international co-production of Denmark, Belgium, France, and Germany.

The world premiere of the uncut Volume I occurred on 16 February 2014 at the 64th Berlin International Film Festival, while the uncut Volume II premiered at the 71st Venice International Film Festival. The world premiere of the Director's Cut took place in Copenhagen on 10 September 2014. It was nominated for the 2014 Nordic Council Film Prize.

Nymphomaniac is the third and final installment in von Trier's unofficially titled Depression Trilogy, following Antichrist and Melancholia.

Plot

On a snowy evening, middle-aged bachelor Seligman (Stellan Skarsgård) finds self-diagnosed nymphomaniac Joe (Charlotte Gainsbourg) beaten up and lying in the alleyway behind his apartment. He takes her back to his home and, over tea, listens intently as Joe recounts the story of her libidinous life. Seligman, a highly educated but cloistered man, connects and analyses Joe's stories with what he has read about. Seligman's favourite hobby to read about is fly fishing, which is why he has a fly fishing lure on his wall and this is how their conversation begins. Throughout the story he parallels much of what she has experienced with various methods of the sport.

Volume I

Inspired by a fly fishing lure on the wall behind her and Seligman's love of Izaak Walton's book The Compleat Angler, Joe opens her story by talking about her precocious sexual fascination during her early childhood. Her father (Christian Slater) is a tree-loving doctor whom she adores while her mother (Connie Nielsen) is, as Joe describes her, a "cold bitch". In adolescence, Joe (Stacy Martin) loses her virginity to an arbitrary young man named Jerôme (Shia LaBeouf). This first encounter, which ends with Jerôme casually leaving her to fix his moped, leaves her disappointed, while Seligman observes that the combination of the number of times Jerôme penetrated her, three times vaginally and five times anally, resembles the Fibonacci sequence.

Several years later, Joe engages in a contest with her friend B (Sophie Kennedy Clark) during a train journey; whichever of the two women has sex with the most passengers by the train's arrival at the station wins a bag of chocolate sweets. After having sex in the toilet with several of the men she comes across, Joe wins by performing a blowjob on a passenger in a first-class car, S (Jens Albinus). S is a married man who resists both her and B's advances, but ultimately Joe forces herself on him. Joe tells Seligman her encounter with S is the first of many terrible things she has done, but he waves off her accusation.

Over rugelach and a discussion over the lack of masculinity in men using cake forks to eat pastry, Joe talks about her first experiences with actual love, something she dismisses as "lust with jealousy added". Joe takes on more lovers as she, B, and several friends create a club, "The Little Flock", dedicated to liberating themselves from society's fixation on love. Joe eventually leaves after all the other members end up developing serious attachments to their conquests. As a young adult, Joe drops out of medical school and finds work as a secretary at a printing company. Her first employer is none other than Jerôme. While sexual intentions are clearly on his mind, she finds herself avoiding his advances and sleeping with other co-workers, frustrating him. When Joe finally realises she has developed feelings for Jerôme, she writes him a letter. However, she is too late as he has left with his uncle's jealous secretary Liz (Felicity Gilbert), who was fully aware of Joe's feelings. She is immediately fired by his uncle (Jesper Christensen), the actual owner of the company, for her lack of experience and goes back to indulging her nymphomania, despite a yearning for Jerôme.

On one occasion with one of her lovers, H (Hugo Speer), Joe inadvertently causes conflict that makes him leave his wife for her. The distressed Mrs. H (Uma Thurman) arrives and demonises both of them in front of her children, though Joe states in the present that this barely affected her. The situation then becomes more awkward as Joe's next lover, A (Cyron Melville), arrives at the house and finds himself in the middle of Mrs. H's mental breakdown. The family finally leaves, but not before Mrs. H verbally lacerates Joe, slaps her now ex-husband and leaves the apartment wailing.

A conversation about Edgar Allan Poe and his death from delirium tremens reminds Joe of the last time she saw her father. She is the only one to visit him in the hospital as he dies of cancer. Joe's father asks her not to slander her mother, who is afraid of hospitals, for not being by his side, explaining they said their goodbyes. Joe is a firsthand witness as her father deteriorates from a unnamed illness, into fits of violent spasms, paranoid delusions and screams for his wife. To take her mind off her father's suffering, the cause of which she remains naive to, Joe has sexual intercourse with several people at the hospital. When he finally dies, Joe becomes sexually aroused, with a drop of vaginal fluid running down her thigh as she stands in front of the body, and becomes numb with depression.

After Seligman explains how he feels Bach perfected polyphony, Joe uses his example to talk about three lovers leading up to her "cantus firmus". The "bass voice", F (Nicolas Bro) is a tender but predictable man who puts her sexual needs above his own. The "second voice", G (Christian Gade Bjerrum), thrills Joe because of his animalistic control of her in bed. During one of Joe's regular walks in the local park, Jerôme finds her after separating from Liz, a coincidence Seligman finds preposterous, and they embrace. As the two engage in authentically passionate sex – set alongside Joe's experiences with F and G – Joe becomes emotionally distraught when discovering she can no longer "feel anything".

Volume II

Joe becomes annoyed with Seligman, accusing him of overlooking the severity of her lost sexuality to focus on the allegorical before realising he cannot relate to her stories. He goes on to confirm his asexuality and virginity, but assures her his "innocence" and lack of bias makes him the best man to listen to her story. She becomes inspired to tell him another portion of her life after noticing a Rublev-styled icon of the Virgin Mary and a discussion about the differences between the Eastern Church ("the church of happiness") and the Western Church ("the church of suffering").

Joe reminisces about a field trip as a young girl that suggests she had a vision of Valeria Messalina and the Whore of Babylon looking over her as she levitates and spontaneously has her first orgasm, which shocks Seligman as he explains her orgasm is a mockery of the Transfiguration of Jesus on the Mount. Returning to where she left off in her story, Joe falls into a crisis upon losing her ability to achieve sexual pleasure, though she does find a different sort of pleasure in her time with Jerôme. When the two conceive a baby together, Marcel, Jerôme struggles to keep up with her sexual needs and allows her to see other men. This is shown to be detrimental later, as he becomes jealous of her endeavors.

Several years later to no success, Joe's sexual endeavors become increasingly adventurous by engaging in a tryst with a pair of African brothers that turns into a botched threesome; the frustration to reclaim her orgasm culminates in visits to K (Jamie Bell), a sadist who violently assaults women seeking his company. The more she visits him, the more neglectful she becomes in her domestic duties. At Christmas, after stopping an unattended Marcel who has wandered out an opened door onto a snowy balcony from coming into any harm, Jerôme forces her to choose between the family and K. She picks the latter and, after receiving an especially brutal beating from K with a cat o' nine tails that allows her to climax again, takes a path of loneliness away from her one and only possibility of a normal life. Marcel is sent to live in a foster home because Jerôme has no room in his life for him.

To keep the story from ending on an unhappy note, Joe concludes it with the first time K introduced her to "the Silent Duck", which leaves Seligman surprised and impressed at K's talents.

Looking at the mirror facing Seligman's bed, Joe jumps ahead in time. Several years later, Joe has regained pleasure, but her genitalia are left with some irreversible damage due to a lifetime of sexual activity mixed with K's brutality. Her habits are known around her new office, prompting the boss to demand she attend sex addiction therapy under the threat of losing her job and any future job she takes.

When asked why she refused to attend therapy, Joe talks about becoming pregnant after leaving Jerôme and Marcel and demanding her doctor abort the 11-week pregnancy, but he insists she speak to a counselor first. The visit to the psychologist (Caroline Goodall) ends disastrously due to Joe's attitude towards the situation. She decides to take matters into her own hands and perform the abortion herself. Using the knowledge she had retained from medical school, Joe aborts the fetus with the use of several household implements and a wire hanger. Back in the present, Joe and Seligman get into a very heated argument regarding Joe's actions, abortion rights in general and Seligman's potential hypocrisy in supporting them while wanting to know nothing about how the actual procedure is performed.

Joe reluctantly attends the meetings and, after ridding her apartment of almost everything in it, attempts sobriety. During one meeting three weeks later, she sees a reflection of her younger self in the mirror, harshly insults every member of the group, including the therapist, and proclaims pride in her nymphomania before walking out.

Joe tells Seligman she is not sure where to conclude her story as she has used every item from around his room to help inspire each "chapter". After a suggestion from him, she notices how the stain from a cup of tea she had earlier thrown in anger looks like a Walther PPK, the same kind of gun her favourite literary character James Bond uses, and knows exactly how and where to end things.

Realising she has no place in "normal" society, Joe turns to organised crime and becomes a debt collector, utilising her extensive knowledge of men, sex, and sadomasochism. She reminisces about a memorable housecall to a man (Jean-Marc Barr) who she initially finds sexually unreadable. She ties him to a chair, strips him and attempts to provoke him with every sexual scenario she can think of. Upon further interrogation, Joe gleans that he is a repressed pedophile. She takes pity on him and fellates him. Joe explains to Seligman how she feels deep compassion for people born with a forbidden sexuality. She strongly identifies with the man's loneliness and status as a sexual outcast, and lauds him for going through life without acting on his aberrant desires.

Joe's superior, L (Willem Dafoe), recommends that she groom an apprentice and suggests P (Mia Goth), the 15-year-old daughter of criminals. Joe is initially repulsed by the idea, but ends up sympathising with the girl in question. P is a vulnerable, lonely, emotionally damaged young girl who quickly latches herself onto Joe. The two of them click and form a special connection. Joe opens her heart to P and eventually invites her to move into her home. Over time, Joe and P's relationship develops a sexual dimension, leading to romance. As P seems to mature, Joe hesitantly decides to teach her young female lover the ropes of her trade.

During one round of debt collection, Joe notices that they are at a house belonging to Jerôme (now played by Michaël Pas) and, to make sure she is not seen, tells P to perform her first solo job. This proves to be a mistake as Joe eventually discovers P is having an affair with Jerôme. After finding her "soul tree" in a failed attempt to leave town, Joe waits for Jerôme and P in the alley between his home and her apartment and pulls a gun she confiscated from P earlier on him. When she pulls the trigger, she forgets to rack the pistol. Jerôme viciously beats Joe and then has sex with P right in front of her, thrusting into P in exactly the same way he once took her virginity. P urinates on her before leaving her as she was at the beginning of the film.

In the present, Seligman suggests how the circumstances of Joe's life might have been due to differences in gender representation; all of the stigma, guilt and shame she felt for her actions made her fight back aggressively "like a man", ultimately "forgetting" to rack the gun because her human worth would not allow her to kill someone, even Jerôme. Joe, who has until this moment been playing devil's advocate to Seligman's assumptions, finally feels at ease, having unburdened her story to someone whom she truly considers a friend. She vows to rid herself of her sexuality, no matter how much of a struggle it is. She says she is too tired to go on and asks to go to sleep.

As Joe begins to drift off, Seligman silently returns with his pants off and attempts to rape her. Joe wakes up and, realising what Seligman is doing, reaches for and racks the gun. Seligman protests and attempts to justify his behaviour, but Joe shoots him, grabs her things, and flees the apartment.

Cast

Main cast
 Charlotte Gainsbourg as Joe (ages 35–50)
 Stacy Martin as Young Joe (ages 15–31)
 Stellan Skarsgård as Seligman
 Shia LaBeouf as Jerôme Morris
 Christian Slater as Joe's Father
 Jamie Bell as K
 Uma Thurman as Mrs. H
 Willem Dafoe as L
 Mia Goth as P
 Sophie Kennedy Clark as B
 Connie Nielsen as Katherine (Joe's mother)
 Michaël Pas as Older Jerôme
 Jean-Marc Barr as The Debtor Gentleman
 Udo Kier as The Waiter

Vol. I cast
 Maja Arsovic as Joe (7 years)
 Sofie Kasten as B (10 years)
 Ananya Berg as Joe (10 years)
 James Northcote as Young Lad #1 on Train
 Charlie G. Hawkins as Young Lad #2 on Train
 Jens Albinus as S
 Felicity Gilbert as Liz, The Secretary
 Jesper Christensen as Jerôme's Uncle
 Hugo Speer as Mr. H
 Cyron Melville as Andy (A)
 Saskia Reeves as Nurse
 Nicolas Bro as F
 Christian Gade Bjerrum as G

Vol. II cast
 Shanti Roney as Tobias, The Interpreter
 Laura Christensen as Babysitter
 Caroline Goodall as Psychologist
 Kate Ashfield as Therapist
 Tania Carlin as Renée
 Daniela Lebang as Brunelda
 Omar Shargawi as Thug #1
 Marcus Jakovljevic as Thug #2
 Severin Von Hoensbroech as Debtor In Greenhouse

Production

Pre-production
Executive producer and Zentropa co-founder Peter Aalbæk Jensen revealed that the film is to be two parts. "We are making two films. It is a big operation. I personally hope that we should be ready for Cannes next year. We will shoot both and edit both – and we want to finish both at the same time." He explained there will be two versions of each film: an explicit cut and a softer cut.

LaBeouf got his role in Nymphomaniac by sending a tape of himself having intercourse with his girlfriend Karolyn Pho to von Trier. Slater got connected to von Trier via his agent being in Denmark and used makeup under his eyes to make himself look old enough to be Joe's father.

LaBeouf said in August 2012, "The movie is what you think it is. It is Lars von Trier, making a movie about what he's making. For instance, there's a disclaimer at the top of the script that basically says we're doing it for real. Everything that is illegal, we'll shoot in blurred images. Other than that, everything is happening. ... [V]on Trier's dangerous. He scares me. And I'm only going to work now when I'm terrified."

Filming
Principal photography occurred between 28 August–9 November 2012 in Cologne and Hilden, Germany, and in Ghent, Belgium.

To produce scenes of simulated sex, von Trier used digital compositing to superimpose the genitals of pornographic film actors onto the bodies of the film's actors. Producer Louise Vesth explained during the Cannes Film Festival:

We shot the actors pretending to have sex and then had the body doubles, who really did have sex, and in post we will digital impose the two. So above the waist it will be the star and the below the waist it will be the doubles.

Gainsbourg and Martin further revealed that prosthetic vaginas and closed sets were used during filming. Martin stated that her acting experience for the film was enjoyable and, after explaining that the film's characters are a reflection of the director himself, referred to the process as an "honour." Martin also stated that shooting the sex scenes was a bit boring due to their technical nature.

The film makes several references to the other films in the trilogy. For example, the scene showing Marcel approaching an open upper floor window references the similar sequence during the beginning of Antichrist and even uses the same background music from that aforementioned scene. Furthermore, Joe's monologue about loneliness is edited to shots of the universe from Melancholia. As a reference to von Trier's comments at the 2011 Cannes Film Festival, during a scene available in the director's cut only, "Joe says she could understand dictators such as Hitler. Seligman shakes his head in disbelief. After she showed sympathy for racists and pedophiles, it is quite obvious that she also has to sympathize with the biggest mass murderer in history." Joe has been referred to as a "proto-fascist heroine".

Music
A seven-track soundtrack was released digitally by Zentropa on 27 June 2014, containing a mix of classical and modern rock music, along with two sound clips from the prologue of the film.

Marketing

In early 2013, the first teaser poster was released from the film's official website. Shortly thereafter, Zentropa released a promotional photo shoot featuring the film's main characters posing in suggestive positions and a list of the film's chapters. This was followed by the release of a picture of Trier himself with duct tape covering his mouth, accompanied by a press release explaining the official launch of the film's campaign.

An incremental marketing campaign was used to promote the film, as brief video segments, each described as an "appetizer" by the film's production company, were released online leading up to the film's release date. Each appetizer represented each of the eight chapters of Nymphomaniac and the first one, entitled "The Compleat Angler", appeared on 28 June 2013, the last Friday of the month—this pattern would be followed for the monthly release of the subsequent clips. Following "The Compleat Angler", "Jerôme" featuring Martin and LaBeouf, was released in August; "Mrs. H" in September; the predominantly black-and-white "Delirium" (containing a voice-over by Skarsgård) was released in October; in November, the appetizer for "The Little Organ School" was uploaded to YouTube, but was quickly removed due to its explicit content; "The Eastern and the Western Church" was released exclusively for Vimeo on 29 November; in December, the appetizer for "The Mirror" was released, again on Vimeo; and on 25 December, leading into the European release of the film, "The Gun" was released on the film's official website.

In October 2013, a series of posters were released, each depicting the film's characters during the moment of orgasm. Along with the appetizers and the character posters, five theatrical posters (three for the complete feature and one for each volume) and an international trailer featuring some of the explicit sexual scenes, were released.

In July 2014, Zentropa revealed the poster for the Director's Cut when announcing its premiere at the Venice Film Festival. The poster combined the original teaser with Lars von Trier standing in between the two parentheses.

Rating
Nymphomaniac initially received an NC-17 from the Motion Picture Association of America in early 2014. The film, however, surrendered the rating and was released without any MPAA rating.

Release

Von Trier's complete five-and-a-half-hour version was released in few territories and only long after the original premiere. Instead, a four-hour version was edited without the director's involvement and has been used for the film's international release, divided into two volumes – Volume I and Volume II – with ninety minutes removed.

A "secret" advance screening of Volume I occurred at the Sundance Film Festival on 21 January 2014, at the Egyptian Theater with tickets distributed bearing the film title "Film X" amidst rumors the film could either be von Trier's film, or Wes Anderson's The Grand Budapest Hotel. The film's UK premiere took place on 22 February 2014. In the United States, the film was also released in two parts, billed as Nymphomaniac: Volume I and Nymphomaniac: Volume II, but on separate dates: 21 March 2014 and 4 April 2014.

In Australia and New Zealand, the four-hour version of the film was distributed by the Transmission Films company. Released on 20 March 2014, the two volumes were shown back-to-back with an interval.

In February 2014, the uncut Volume I was screened at the Berlin Film Festival. In September 2014, the uncut version of Volume I and Volume II was screened at the Venice Film Festival. The complete Director's Cut, including both volumes, was finally released to a general audience in Copenhagen, Denmark, premiering on 10 September 2014, where it was shown with a half-hour intermission at a red carpet gala screening with von Trier present in the audience; at this premiere, during the film's restored abortion sequence, where Joe performs an abortion on herself, three male audience members fainted and had to be carried out of the cinema.

Reception
On Rotten Tomatoes, Volume I achieved a 76% approval rating and an average rating of 6.9/10, based on 202 reviews; the website's critical consensus states: "Darkly funny, fearlessly bold, and thoroughly indulgent, Nymphomaniac finds Lars von Trier provoking viewers with customary abandon." Volume II received a 60% rating with an average of 6.4/10, based on 126 reviews; the consensus states: "It doesn't quite live up to the promise of the first installment, but Nymphomaniac: Volume II still benefits from Lars von Trier's singular craft and vision, as well as a bravura performance from Charlotte Gainsbourg." On Metacritic, the first volume holds a 64/100 rating based on 41 critics, indicating "generally favorable reviews". The second volume gained a 60/100 rating based on 34 critics, indicating "mixed or average reviews".

In the UK, Martin Solibakke of Mancunion praised Stacy Martin's performance, saying he had "never felt so sure about an actress's future success since I saw Jennifer Lawrence in Winter's Bone four years ago". He ended his review with hailing the film, saying "Lars von Trier ends up hitting the G-spot of avant-garde filmmaking with a movie only he could ever make, and gives the open-minded members of the audience one of the most powerful and sensational experiences ever seen in arts."

Michelle Orange of The Village Voice called it a "jigsaw opus, an extended and generally exquisitely crafted riff." In The Australian, David Stratton said that he "detested" some of Trier's films, and states that Nymphomaniac "seems designed to be his magnum opus, the film in which he gets to rail against everything he loathes about contemporary life and contemporary cinema." The modified version is screening in Australia, officially referred to as the "international" version. Stratton further stated on the television review program At the Movies that he found the four-hour runtime of the film to be "daunting", but praised some of the performances, particularly those of Stacy Martin and Jamie Bell. Stratton's co-host Margaret Pomeranz meanwhile, while also praising the boldness of the performances, felt the film's unsimulated depictions of sex didn't add to the narrative and as such had, "such an undercurrent of sadism that I was, not repelled, but distanced". Thought Catalog remarked on how the plot failed to be consistent or plausible.

Keith Uhlich of The A.V. Club named Nymphomaniac the third-best film of 2014.

On the Melbourne community radio station, 3RRR, film criticism program "Plato's Cave" praised von Trier's work on Nymphomaniac and presenters, Thomas Caldwell and Josh Nelson, defended the director against accusations of misogyny. Both presenters agreed that actresses who von Trier has worked with, such as Nicole Kidman and Björk, have delivered excellent performances in his films, while Nelson referred to Antichrist and Melancholia, the first two installments of the Depression Trilogy, as "masterpieces". Caldwell concludes the review by stating, "... if you're coming new to him [Von Trier], I think this is a real crash course in all his preoccupations."

When the complete Director's Cut had its general release world premiere in Copenhagen on 10 September 2014, major Danish critics gave it high ratings. In spite of this, the Director's Cut sold only 3,494 tickets in Danish cinemas.

Accolades

Home media
Nymphomaniac was released both together (in a two-disc set) and separately via DVD and Blu-ray in the United States on 8 July 2014. Director's Cut was made available in the US on both home media formats on 25 November 2014. In December 2014, the Director's Cut was released on Netflix, where the theatrical versions were already streaming.

See also

 Anita: Swedish Nymphet
 Unsimulated sex in film
 List of longest films

References

External links

 
 Official website at Magnolia Pictures
 
 
 
 

2010s avant-garde and experimental films
2010s erotic drama films
2010s English-language films
2013 drama films
2013 films
2013 independent films
2013 LGBT-related films
Adultery in films
Asexuality in fiction
BDSM in films
Belgian avant-garde and experimental films
Belgian erotic drama films
Belgian independent films
Belgian LGBT-related films
Best Danish Film Robert Award winners
Bisexuality-related films
British avant-garde and experimental films
British erotic drama films
British independent films
British LGBT-related films
British nonlinear narrative films
Danish avant-garde and experimental films
Danish erotic drama films
Danish independent films
Danish LGBT-related films
Danish nonlinear narrative films
English-language Danish films
English-language French films
English-language German films
English-language Belgian films
Films about abortion
Films about depression
Films about diseases
Films about immigration
Films about pedophilia
Films about prostitution
Films about psychiatry
Films about race and ethnicity
Films about rape
Films about religion
Films about sex addiction
Films about virginity
Obscenity controversies in film
Sexual-related controversies in film
Rating controversies in film
Advertising and marketing controversies in film
Film controversies in Romania
Film controversies in the United States
Film controversies
Films directed by Lars von Trier
Films released in separate parts
Films shot in Cologne
Films shot in Denmark
Films shot in Ghent
French avant-garde and experimental films
French erotic drama films
French independent films
French LGBT-related films
French nonlinear narrative films
German avant-garde and experimental films
German erotic drama films
German independent films
German LGBT-related films
Films produced by Louise Vesth
2010s British films
2010s French films
2010s German films
Zentropa films